The Arab Women's Handball Championship of Club Winners' Cup also known Princess Khadija Handball Championship is an international club handball competition organized by the Arab Handball Federation, it concerne the women's club winners' cup of countries of the Arab World.

Results

Winners by club

Winners by country

See also
Arab Women's Handball Championship of Champions
Arab Women's Handball Super Cup
Arab Handball Championship of Champions
Arab Handball Championship of Winners' Cup
Arab Handball Super Cup

External links
10th Women's Arab Handball Cup Winners' Cup - Arryadia

Arab Womenand#39;s Handball Championship of Winnersand#39; Cup